William Austin Dickinson (April 16, 1829 – August 16, 1895) was an American lawyer.  Known to family and friends as "Austin", he was the older brother of the poet Emily Dickinson.

After graduating from both Williston Seminary and Amherst College, Dickinson taught briefly before pursuing a legal education. He attended Harvard Law School, then joined his father, Edward Dickinson, in his law practice. After his father's death, Austin became treasurer of Amherst College from 1873 until his death.  In addition to his law practice and treasury work, Dickinson took part in numerous civic projects and responsibilities, such as moderating the town meetings from 1881 until his death, and acting as president of the Village Improvement Association. He was responsible for getting Frederick Law Olmstead to design the Amherst Common, and was instrumental in the development of Wildwood Cemetery in Amherst.

On July 1, 1856, Dickinson married Susan Huntington Gilbert, a friend of his sister Emily from childhood. They had three children and resided at the Evergreens, which stood, and still stands, adjacent to the Dickinson Homestead in downtown Amherst. Aside from his connection to his world-famous sister, Emily, Austin is also known for his longtime affair with Mabel Loomis Todd, a young Amherst College faculty wife who would eventually edit the first few collections of Emily Dickinson's poetry.

Notes

References
Longsworth, Polly. 1984. Austin and Mabel: The Amherst Affair and Love Letters of Austin Dickinson and Mabel Loomis Todd. New York: Farrar, Straus, and Giroux. .
Sewall, Richard B.. 1974. The Life of Emily Dickinson. New York: Farrar, Straus, and Giroux. .

People from Amherst, Massachusetts
Amherst College alumni
Harvard Law School alumni
1829 births
1895 deaths
19th-century American poets
American male poets
Dickinson family